The 2014 Evergreen Premier League (referred to as the EPLWA) was the first season of the Evergreen Premier League. The season began on 26 April 2014.

Eight clubs participated.

Spokane Shadow won the Evergreen Premier League title.

League table

Results

Top scorers

References 

2016
Evergreen